Muley Point is a cliff in Iron County, Utah. It overlooks the northern end of the Parowan Valley, where Fremont Wash enters it.

References

Landforms of Iron County, Utah